

Season summary 
Between the end of spring and the beginning of summer, Torino changed his chairman: Mario Gerbi replaced Sergio Rossi. Foreign contingent was also substituted, with Anton Polster and Klaus Berggreen called to do not make regret Wim Kieft and Leo Junior.

Polster copied the former striker, throwing several balls in net during his initial appearances. Torino knocked out the citizen rivals in domestic cup but lost the final in face of Sampdoria. En other, Juventus got a heavier revenge: due to equal points in league (31) it needs a play-off for last UEFA Cup spot, awarded in a match that "bianconeri" won on shoot-out.

Squad

Goalkeepers
  Fabrizio Lorieri
  Alessandro Zaninelli

Defenders
  Silvano Benedetti
  Giancarlo Corradini
  Roberto Cravero
  Riki De Bin
  Giacomo Ferri
  Ezio Rossi

Midfielders
  Klaus Berggreen
  Antonio Comi
  Massimo Crippa
  Diego Fuser
  Gianluigi Lentini
  Antonio Sabato

Attackers
  Anton Polster
  Giorgio Bresciani
  Tullio Gritti

Competitions

Serie A

League table

Matches

Topscorers
  Anton Polster 9
  Tullio Gritti 7
  Antonio Comi 3
  Roberto Cravero 3
  Massimo Crippa 3

UEFA Cup qualification

Juventus qualified for 1988–89 UEFA Cup.

Coppa Italia 

First round

Eightfinals

Quarterfinals

Semifinals

Final

References

Sources
RSSSF - Italy 1987/88

Torino F.C. seasons
Torino